Nvidia Titan is a series of video cards developed by Nvidia including:

GTX Titan, released in 2013
GTX Titan Black, released in February 2014
GTX Titan Z, released in March 2014
GTX Titan X, released in 2015
Titan X (2016), released in 2016
Titan Xp, released in April 2017
Titan V, released in December 2017
Titan RTX, released in 2018